Vitus Nagorny (born 21 June 1978) is a Kyrgyzstan-born German former footballer who played as a striker for twelve different clubs during his career.

References

External links 
 

1978 births
Living people
People from Jalal-Abad Region
German footballers
Association football forwards
Bundesliga players
2. Bundesliga players
3. Liga players
Kyrgyzstani footballers
Kyrgyzstani expatriate footballers
German people of Kyrgyzstani descent
VfL Wolfsburg players
VfL Wolfsburg II players
Karlsruher SC players
1. FC Schweinfurt 05 players
FC Augsburg players
SV Wehen Wiesbaden players
FC Erzgebirge Aue players
SV Eintracht Trier 05 players
SV Elversberg players
FC Bayern Munich II players
VfR Aalen players